The Leipzig Kings are an American football team in Leipzig, Germany, that plays in the European League of Football (ELF).

History 
The Leipzig franchise was announced along with Berlin Thunder and Cologne Centurions in March 2021, as part of the inaugural season of the European League of Football. In April, ELF commissioner Patrick Esume praised the potential of Leipzig for growing the sport and the athletes in the university, despite the relatively short time for the Kings to prepare for the first season. 

The Kings introduced their first head coach, Fred Armstrong, who previously coached the national teams of Sweden, the Czech Republic and Austria, and also gained coaching experience with Stuttgart Scorpions and two NFL teams, New York Jets and New York Giants. 

On May 7, 2021, the Kings signed Japanese wide receiver Yoshihito Omi who would be the first Asian player playing in ELF. In 2019, Omi led in receiving with 33 catches and 544 yards for IBM Big Blue in X League, and acted as captain for the Japan national American football team.

Season-by-season

Stadium 
The Kings are playing their home games at the 4,999 capacity Alfred-Kunze-Sportpark.

Roster

Staff

References

External links
 Official website

European League of Football teams
American football teams in Germany
Sport in Leipzig
 
2021 establishments in Germany
American football teams established in 2021